The 2005–06 New Zealand Knights FC season was the club's inaugural season in the Australian A-League. Picking up just one win and three draws out of the 21 regular season matches, the Knights finished at the bottom of the table, 20 points behind 7th placed Melbourne Victory.

Season overview
In their debut season, the Knights scored only 15 goals in their 21 fixtures. Their joint leading scorers were Englishman Simon Yeo and teenage whizkid Jeremy Brockie, with four apiece. Sean Devine scored three goals, while Joshua Rose, Jeremy Christie, Neil Emblen and Xiaobin Zhang all managed to find the back of the net once. Former Walsall right-back Darren Bazeley was the only Knight to start in all 21 of their games.

The club was plunged into turmoil in late 2005, as club captain Danny Hay apparently fell out with Knights bosses and coach John Adshead, and was released just before Christmas. This followed the departures of UK signings Ronnie Bull and former Lincoln City striker Simon Yeo.

The Knights may have had poor crowds in their inaugural A-League season but they did have loyal support from their supporters group, Bloc-5. Supporters who formerly supported the now-defunct Football Kingz franchise, are known for dressing up in the team's colours, chanting loudly and attending all home fixtures.

Immediately after the season, the Knights fired assistant coach Tommy Mason. Former Fulham reserve team and academy head coach Paul Nevin was named head coach to assist current manager John Adshead as Mason's replacement.

One positive to come out of the Knights' horrific debut season was 17-year-old New Zealander Jeremy Brockie. The dreadlocked midfielder-cum-striker was originally selected as one of the Knights three under-20 players in their squad. By the end of the season though, he had become a regular starter, scoring a brilliant double at home against the Newcastle Jets. This was followed up by a fantastic strike to earn a draw with Sydney FC, and a goal in the Knights' final game of the season, versus Melbourne Victory.

Transfers

In

Transfers out

Squad statistics

|}

Competitions

Pre-season

A-League

References

2005–06
2005–06 A-League season by team
2005–06 in New Zealand association football